Deshabandu Romesh Shantha Kaluwitharana (born 24 November 1969) is a former Sri Lankan cricketer who represented the Sri Lanka national cricket team from 1990 to 2004. He was a key member and wicket-keeper for 1996 Cricket World Cup winning team and renowned for his aggressive batting style.

Kaluwitharana along with Sanath Jayasuriya, are credited for having revolutionized one-day international cricket with explosive batting in the mid-1990s, which initiated the hard-hitting modern-day batting strategy of all nations. He made his Twenty20 debut on 17 August 2004, for Colts Cricket Club in the 2004 SLC Twenty20 Tournament. He was appointed as the interim cricket coach of Malaysia on the 17 May 2008. He was educated at St. Sebastian's College, Moratuwa.

International career
His early career made him look like a good Sri Lankan prospect, and the undoubted highlight of his career was the entertaining innings of 132 not out (including 26 boundaries) that he made on Test debut against a powerful Australian side in 1992. However, he failed to deliver on his promise in a declining Sri Lankan team (prior to the revival of Sri Lankan cricket at the 1996 World Cup).

Once in the national side, he sometimes threw his wicket away due to poor shot-selection and was suspect to the swinging delivery. However, he relished pace and would often be quick to put away any delivery off line or length. His greatest contribution to ODIs came after he was promoted to the top of the batting order to partner opener Sanath Jayasuriya during the 1995–96 tour of Australia, helping to give birth to an aggressive batting approach in the first fifteen overs of fielding restrictions. This new strategy of attacking from the outset heavily contributed to Sri Lanka to win all their matches and secure the 1996 Cricket World Cup as all other teams were not prepared for such an attack. Kaluwitharana was the wicket keeper and opener with Jayasuriya in that world cup series that was captained by Arjuna Ranatunga.

Beyond cricket
He started a project Kalu's Hideaway, a luxury jungle retreat in Udawalawe.

References

1969 births
Living people
Sri Lanka One Day International cricketers
Sri Lanka Test cricketers
Cricketers who made a century on Test debut
Sri Lankan cricketers
Basnahira South cricketers
Colts Cricket Club cricketers
Galle Cricket Club cricketers
Sebastianites Cricket and Athletic Club cricketers
Sri Lankan cricket coaches
Deshabandu
Alumni of St. Sebastian's College, Moratuwa
Wicket-keepers